Tel Megiddo (Tell el-Mutesellim, lit. Megiddo is known for its historical, geographical, and theological importance, especially under its Greek name Armageddon. During the Bronze Age, Megiddo was an important Canaanite city-state and during the Iron Age, a royal city in the Kingdom of Israel.

Megiddo drew much of its importance from its strategic location at the northern end of the Wadi Ara defile, which acts as a pass through the Carmel Ridge, and from its position overlooking the rich Jezreel Valley from the west.

Excavations have unearthed 20 strata of ruins since the Neolithic phase, indicating a long period of settlement. The site is now protected as Megiddo National Park and is a World Heritage Site.

Etymology

The Book of Revelation describes an apocalyptic battle at Armageddon:  (Har¦magedōn), a Koine Greek transliteration of the Hebrew "Har Megiddo" (Mount Megiddo). From this surreal appearance in a well-known eschatological text, the term "Armageddon" has come to signify any world-ending catastrophe.

History

Megiddo was important in the ancient world. It guarded the western branch of a narrow pass on the most important trade route of the ancient Fertile Crescent, linking Egypt with Mesopotamia and Asia Minor and known today as Via Maris. Because of its strategic location, Megiddo was the site of several battles. It was inhabited approximately from 5000 to 350 BCE, or even, as Megiddo Expedition archaeologists suggest, since around 7000 BCE.

Neolithic and Chalcolithic
Archaeological Stratum XX in Tel Megiddo began around 5000 BCE belonging to Neolithic period. The first Yarmukian culture remains were found at this level in the 1930s excavations, but they were not recognized as such then. These remains, found in Area BB, were pottery, a figurine, and flint items. Chalcolithic period came next, with significant content around 4500-3500 BCE, as part of the Wadi Rabah culture, at the following base level of Tel Megiddo, which as other large tell sites in the region, was located near a spring.

Early Bronze Age
Megiddo's Early Bronze Age I (3500–2950 BCE) was originally worked in 1933–1938 by the Oriental Institute. Decades later, a temple from the end of this period was found and dated to Early Bronze Age IB (ca. 3000 BCE) and described by its excavators, Adams, Finkelstein, and Ussishkin, as "the most monumental single edifice so far uncovered" in the early Bronze Age Levant and among the largest structures of its time in the Near East. Samples, obtained by Israel Finkelstein's Megiddo Expedition, at the temple-hall in year 2000, provided calibrated dates from the 31st and 30th century BCE, the temple is the most monumental Early Bronze I structure known in the Levant, if not the entire Ancient Near East. Archaeologists' view is that "taking into account the manpower and administrative work required for its construction, it provides the best manifestation for the first wave of urban life and, probably, city-state formation in the Levant". To the South of this temple there is an unparalleled monumental compound which was excavated by the Megiddo Expedition in 1996 and 1998, and belongs to the later phase of Early Bronze IB, ca. 3090-2950 BCE. It consists of several long, parallel stone walls, each of which is 4 meters wide. Between the walls were narrow corridors, filled hip-deep with the remains of animal sacrifice. These walls lie immediately below the huge ‘megaron’ temples of the Early Bronze III (2700-2300 BCE). The megaron temples remained in use through the Intermediate Bronze period.

Magnetometer research, before 2006 excavations, had found the entire Tel Megiddo settlement covered an area of ca. 50 hectares, being the largest Early Bronze Age I site known in the Levant. However, Pierre de Miroschedji, in 2014, stated that Tel Megiddo had around 25 hectares in Early Bronze IA and IB periods, when most of settlements in the region only covered a maximum area of 5 hectares, but that excavations suggest large sites like Tel Megiddo were "sparsely built, with dwellings disorderly distributed and separated by open spaces."

Tel Megiddo was still among the large fortified sites, between 5 and 12 hectares, during Early Bronze II-III period, when its palace testifies that it was a real city-state "characterized by a strong social hierarchy, a hereditary centralized power, and the functioning of a palatial economy."

The town declined in the Early Bronze Age IV period (2300–2000 BCE) as the Early Bronze Age political systems collapsed at the last quarter of the third millennium BCE.

Middle Bronze Age
Early in the second millennium BCE, at the beginning of Middle Bronze Age, urbanism once again took hold throughout of the southern Levant and large urban centers served as political power in city-states. By the later Middle Bronze Age, the inland valleys were dominated by regional centers such as Megiddo which reached a size of more than 20 hectares (including the upper and lower cities). A royal burial was found in Tel Megiddo, dating to the later phase of the Middle Bronze Age, around 1700-1600 BCE, when the power of Canaanite Megiddo was at its peak and before the ruling dynasty collapsed under the might of Thutmose's army.

Late Bronze Age

At the Battle of Megiddo the city was subjugated by Thutmose III (r. 1479–1425 BCE), and became part of the Egyptian Empire. However, the city still prospered, and a massive and elaborate government palace was constructed in the Late Bronze Age.

In the Amarna Period (c. 1353–1336 BCE), Megiddo was a vassalage of the Egyptian Empire. The Amarna Letter E245 mentions local ruler Biridiya of Megiddo. Other contemporary rulers mentioned were Labaya of Shechem and Surata of Akka, nearby cities. This ruler is also mentioned in the corpus from the city of 'Kumidu', the Kamid al lawz. This indicates that there was relations between Megiddo and Kumidu.

Megiddo's Stratum VIIB lasted until slightly before or in the reign of Ramesses III (c. 1184-1143 BCE), as Egypt's control of this Canaanite region ended around 1140 BCE, and the beginning of Philistine Bichrome pottery at Megiddo was after 1124 BCE, or in the period (c. 1128-1079 BCE). These dates are based on radiocarbon dating with a  confidence of 95.4%.

Iron Age
The Canaanite city came to an end in the Early Iron Age I, around the middle of 11th century BCE, not earlier than 1073 BCE, as destruction of Stratum VIIA in the palace and adjacent Level H-11 building took place. The city represented by Stratum VI seems to have been of mixed Israelite and Philistine character, and fell victim to fire, when the earliest fragmentary Gate 3165 from Stratum VIA in the Late Iron Age I, around 1037-913 BCE, was destroyed along with the whole city. This destruction can be attributed to the Egyptian Pharaoh Shoshenq I, who took Megiddo sometime around 943-922 BCE, which is attested in a stele placed at the site and in his inscriptions at the Temple of Karnak.

Rulers of the Israelite Northern Kingdom improved the fortress from around 900 to 750 BCE as the palaces, water systems and fortifications of the site at this period were among the most elaborate Iron Age constructions found in Levant. There is also a "Solomonic gate" (Gate 2156), which belongs to Stratum VA-IVB and is dated by some archaeologist to the 10th century BCE, but latest excavations and new radiocarbon analysis by Megiddo Expedition, led by Israel Finkelstein, date it during the time of Omride dynasty in the Late Iron Age IIA (around 886-760 BCE). 

Tel Megiddo became an important city, before being destroyed, possibly by Aramaean raiders, and rebuilt, this time as an administrative center for Tiglath-Pileser III's occupation of Samaria. Tiglath-Pileser III had conquered Megiddo in 732 BCE becoming it the capital of the Neo-Assyrian Empire province Magiddu.

In 609 BCE, Megiddo was conquered by Egyptians under Necho II during the Battle of Megiddo. Its importance soon dwindled, and it was thought as finally abandoned around 586 BCE. Since that time it would have remained uninhabited, preserving ruins pre-dating 586 BCE without settlements ever disturbing them. But archaeologist Eric Cline considers Tel Megiddo came to an end later, around 350 BCE, during Achaemenid times. Then, the town of al-Lajjun (not to be confused with the al-Lajjun archaeological site in Jordan) was built up near to the site, but without inhabiting or disturbing its remains.

Modern Israel

Today, Megiddo Junction is on the main road connecting the center of Israel with lower Galilee and the north. It lies at the northern entrance to Wadi Ara, an important mountain pass connecting the Jezreel Valley within Israel's coastal plain.

In 1964, during Pope Paul VI's visit to the Holy Land, Megiddo was the site where he met with Israeli dignitaries, including President Zalman Shazar and the Prime Minister Levi Eshkol.

Battles
Famous battles include:
 Battle of Megiddo (15th century BCE): fought between the armies of the Egyptian pharaoh Thutmose III and a large Canaanite coalition led by the rulers of Megiddo and Kadesh.
 Battle of Megiddo (609 BCE): fought between Egyptian pharaoh Necho II and the Kingdom of Judah, in which King Josiah fell.
 Battle of Megiddo (1918): fought during World War I between Allied troops, led by General Edmund Allenby, and the defending Ottoman army.

History of archaeological excavation
Megiddo has been excavated three times and is currently being excavated yet again. The first excavations were carried out between 1903 and 1905 by Gottlieb Schumacher for the German Society for the Study of Palestine. Techniques used were rudimentary by later standards and Schumacher's field notes and records were destroyed in World War I before being published. After the war, Carl Watzinger published the remaining available data from the dig.

In 1925, digging was resumed by the Oriental Institute of the University of Chicago, financed by John D. Rockefeller, Jr., continuing until the outbreak of the Second World War. The work was led initially by Clarence S. Fisher, and later by P. L. O. Guy, Robert Lamon, and Gordon Loud.
 The Oriental Institute intended to completely excavate the whole tel, layer by layer, but money ran out before they could do so. Today excavators limit themselves to a square or a trench on the basis that they must leave something for future archaeologists with better techniques and methods. During these excavations it was discovered that there were around 8 levels of habitation, and many of the uncovered remains are preserved at the Rockefeller Museum in Jerusalem and the Oriental Institute of Chicago. The East Slope area of Megiddo was excavated to the bedrock to serve as a spoil area. The full results of that excavation were not published until decades later.

Yigael Yadin conducted excavations in 1960, 1966, 1967, and 1971 for the Hebrew University. The formal results of those digs were published by Anabel Zarzecki-Peleg in Hebrew University's monograph 2016 Qedem 56.

Megiddo has most recently (since 1994) been the subject of biannual excavation campaigns conducted by the Megiddo Expedition of Tel Aviv University, currently co-directed by Israel Finkelstein, David Ussishkin, and Baruch Halpern with Eric H. Cline of The George Washington University serving as associate director (USA), together with a consortium of international universities. One notable feature of the dig is close on-site co-operation between archaeologists and specialist scientists, with detailed chemical analysis being performed at the dig itself using a field infrared spectrometer.

In 2010, the Jezreel Valley Regional Project, directed by Matthew J. Adams of Bucknell University in cooperation with the Megiddo Expedition, undertook excavations of the eastern extension of the Early Bronze Age town of Megiddo, at the site known as Tel Megiddo (East).

Archaeological features
A path leads up through a six-chambered gate, previously believed to be built by Solomon, but that actually belongs to the Omride dynasty days, found in Stratum VA-IVB, late Iron IIA period, overlooking the excavations of the Oriental Institute. A solid circular stone structure has been interpreted as an altar or a high place from the Canaanite period.

The Great Temple

Megiddo's 5,000 year old "Great Temple", dated to the Early Bronze Age IB (ca. 3000 BCE), has been described by its excavators as "the most monumental single edifice so far uncovered in the EB I Levant and ranks among the largest structures of its time in the Near East." The structure includes an immense, 47.5 by 22 meters sanctuary. The temple was more than ten times larger than the typical temple of that era and was determined to be the site of ritual animal sacrifice. Corridors were used as favissae (deposits of cultic artifacts) to store bones after ritual sacrifice. More than 80% of the animal remains were of young sheep and goats; the rest were cattle.

Jewelry

In 2010, a collection of jewelry pieces was found in a ceramic jug. The jewelry dates to around 1100 BCE. The collection includes beads made of carnelian stone, a ring and earrings. The jug was subjected to molecular analysis to determine the contents. The collection was probably owned by a wealthy Canaanite family, likely belonging to the ruling elite.

Megiddo ivories

The Megiddo ivories are thin carvings in ivory found at Tel Megiddo, the majority excavated by Gordon Loud. The ivories are on display at the Oriental Institute of Chicago and the Rockefeller Museum in Jerusalem. They were found in the stratum VIIA, or Late Bronze Age layer of the site. Carved from hippopotamus incisors from the Nile, they show Egyptian stylistic influence. An ivory pen case was found inscribed with the cartouche of Ramses III.

Megiddo stables

At Megiddo two stable complexes were excavated from Stratum IVA, one in the north and one in the south. Stratum VA-IVB has also been proposed for this area. The southern complex contained five structures built around a lime paved courtyard. The buildings themselves were divided into three sections. Two long stone paved aisles were built adjacent to a main corridor paved with lime. The buildings were about twenty-one meters long by eleven meters wide. Separating the main corridor from outside aisles was a series of stone pillars. Holes were bored into many of these pillars so that horses could be tied to them. Also, the remains of stone mangers were found in the buildings. These mangers were placed between the pillars to feed the horses. It is suggested that each side could hold fifteen horses, giving each building an overall capacity of thirty horses. The buildings on the northern side of the city were similar in their construction. However, there was no central courtyard. The capacity of the northern buildings was about three hundred horses altogether. Both complexes could hold from 450 to 480 horses combined.

The buildings were found during excavations between 1927 and 1934. The head excavator originally interpreted the buildings as stables. Since then his conclusions have been challenged by James Pritchard, Dr Adrian Curtis of Manchester University Ze'ev Herzog, and Yohanan Aharoni, who suggest they were storehouses, marketplaces or barracks.

The Bronze Age tomb 
In 2023 February, the remains of two elite brothers buried with Cypriot pottery, food and other valuable possessions were found in a Bronze Age tomb. Bioarchaeologists identified the early evidence of a Bronze Age cranial surgery called trepanation in one of the brothers. The study published in PLOS One, reports that the younger brother passed away in his teens or early 20s, most likely from an infectious illness like leprosy or tuberculosis. The older brother who died immediately after the surgery had angular notched trephination and was thought to be between the ages of 20 and 40. A 30-millimeter (1.2-inch) square-shaped hole was created on the frontal bone of the skull after his scalp was cut with a sharp instrument with a bevelled-edge.

Megiddo church

The Megiddo church is not on the tell of Megiddo, but nearby next to Megiddo Junction inside the precinct of the Megiddo Prison. It was built within the ancient city of Legio and is believed to date to the 3rd century, which would make it one of the oldest churches in the world. It was situated a few hundreds yards from the base camp of Legio VI Ferrata and one of the mosaics found in the church was donated by a centurion.

See also
 al-Lajjun
 Cities of the ancient Near East

References

Further reading
Gordon Loud, The Megiddo Ivories, Oriental Institute Publication 52, University of Chicago Press, 1939 
P. L. O. Guy, Megiddo Tombs, Oriental Institute Publications 33, The University of Chicago Press, 1938
Robert S. Lamon, The Megiddo Water System, Oriental Institute Publication 32, University of Chicago Press, 1935
H.G. May, Material Remains of the Megiddo Cult, Oriental Institute Publication 26, University of Chicago Press, 1935
Geoffrey M. Shipton, Notes on the Megiddo Pottery of Strata VI-XX, Studies in Ancient Oriental Civilization 17, University of Chicago Press, 1939
Gabrielle V. Novacek, Ancient Israel: Highlights from the Collections of the Oriental Institute, University of Chicago, Oriental Institute Museum Publications 31, Oriental Institute, 2011 
 The Megiddo Ivories, John A. Wilson, American Journal of Archaeology, Vol. 42, No. 3 (Jul. - September, 1938), pp. 333–336
 Luxurious forms: Redefining a Mediterranean "International Style," 1400-1200 B.C., Marian H Feldman, The Art Bulletin, New York, March 2002. Vol. 84, Iss. 1
Rupert Chapman, Putting Sheshonq I in his Place, 2009 (dating, context and analysis of the Sheshonq Fragment), with a reconstructionof the stele at Breasted’s reconstruction of the Sheshonq I Victory Stela (1929: Fig 9).  | Download Scientific Diagram

External links

Tel Megiddo National Park - official site at the Israel Nature and National Parks Protection Authority
The Megiddo Expedition
Jezreel Valley Regional Project
Pamela Weintraub, Rewriting Tel Megiddo's Violent History: At the ancient site of Megiddo, archaeologists unearth new scientific insights that may turn centuries of gospel on its head., Discover Magazine, November 2015 issue
Megiddo At Bibleplaces.com
Megiddo: Tell el-Mutesellim from Images of Archaeological Sites in Israel
 - contains list of Biblical references
Excavation of an early christian building in Megiddo, with floor mosaics (fish) and three inscriptions
The Devil Is Not So Black as He Is Painted: BAR Interviews Israel Finkelstein Biblical Archaeology Review
 Oriental Institute of the University of Chicago Palestine Collection
The Megiddo Expedition: Archaeology and the Bible , UW-L Journal of Undergraduate Research VIII (2005)
H.G. May Archaeology of Palestine Collection - contains images of several archaeological sites, including Tel Megiddo
English translation Schumacher's Tell el-Mutesellim, Volume I: Report of Finds

Amarna letters locations
Apocalypticism
Archaeological museums in Israel
Bronze Age sites in Israel
Bronze Age palaces in Israel
Canaanite cities
Former populated places in Southwest Asia
Hebrew Bible cities
Iron Age sites in Israel
Ivory works of art
Museums in Northern District (Israel)
Museums of Ancient Near East in Israel
National parks of Israel
New Testament cities
Prehistoric sites in Israel
Protected areas of Northern District (Israel)
Tells (archaeology)
World Heritage Sites in Israel